Benjamin Johnson (January 22, 1784 – October 2, 1849) was a United States district judge of the United States District Court for the District of Arkansas.

Education and career

Born on January 22, 1784, in Johnson Station (now Great Crossing) in what is now Scott County, District of Kentucky, Virginia (now Kentucky), Johnson read law. He entered private practice in Georgetown, Kentucky. He was a planter in Scott County, Kentucky. He was a Judge of the Kentucky Circuit Court. He was a Judge of the Superior Court of Arkansas Territory from 1821 to 1836.

Federal judicial service

Following the admission of the State of Arkansas to the Union on June 15, 1836, Johnson was nominated by President Andrew Jackson on June 27, 1836, to the United States District Court for the District of Arkansas, to a new seat authorized by 5 Stat. 50. He was confirmed by the United States Senate on June 29, 1836, and received his commission the same day. His service terminated on October 2, 1849, due to his death in Lexington, Kentucky.

References

Sources
 

1784 births
1849 deaths
People from Scott County, Kentucky
Richard Mentor Johnson family
Conway-Johnson family
American people of Scottish descent
Judges of the United States District Court for the District of Arkansas
Kentucky state court judges
United States federal judges admitted to the practice of law by reading law
United States federal judges appointed by Andrew Jackson
American planters
19th-century American judges